Rafael de Andrade Bittencourt Pinheiro (born 3 March 1982) simply known as Rafael, is a Brazilian retired footballer who played as a goalkeeper. He also holds an Italian passport.

Biography

Early career
He left Brazil for Italy after playing 17 (out of 19) matches in 2007 Campeonato Paulista for Esporte Clube São Bento, ahead of Maurício Assoline. He was an understudy of Júlio Sérgio and Fábio Costa at Santos FC.

Verona
In Verona, after missing only three games (of a possible 136) in four seasons of Lega Pro, the third highest football league in Italy, Rafael played a crucial role in helping his team reach the 2010–11 Lega Pro Division One playoffs and win them, to return to Serie B after a four-year absence. Two seasons later, the Brazilian goalkeeper and his teammates of Verona reach the second place and were promoted to Serie A, with Rafael that impose itself as the best goalkeeper in the junior category (only 29 goals conceded in 40 games).

Rafael was successively confirmed as first choice keeper for the club's Serie A comeback season in 2013, despite the signing of Bulgarian international Nikolay Mihaylov, playing 37 games out of 38 during the full championship.

Cagliari
In 2016 he was sold to Cagliari, with Marco Fossati moved to opposite direction. Cagliari also loaned out its backup goalkeeper Simone Colombi in the same week.

Spezia
On 17 September 2020, Rafael joined Spezia on a free transfer.

Career statistics

1European competitions include the UEFA Champions League.
2Other tournaments include the Supercoppa Italiana and Serie B relegation play–offs.

References

External links
http://futpedia.globo.com/jogadores/rafael16

1982 births
Living people
Footballers from São Paulo
Brazilian footballers
Brazilian people of Italian descent
Brazilian expatriate footballers
Serie A players
Serie B players
Serie C players
Sport Club Corinthians Paulista players
Santos FC players
Esporte Clube São Bento players
Hellas Verona F.C. players
Cagliari Calcio players
Spezia Calcio players
Expatriate footballers in Italy
Brazilian expatriate sportspeople in Italy
Association football goalkeepers